The Comber Wind Farm is a 165.6 megawatt (MW) wind farm in Lakeshore, Ontario, consisting of 72 2.3 MW Siemens SWT 2.3 wind turbines with 101 meter diameter rotors. Construction was completed in January 2012. It is adjacent to the Gosfield Wind Project.

See also

List of wind farms in Canada
List of offshore wind farms

References

External links
Website
"Where is my Electricity Coming From at this Hour? (if I lived in Ontario)" (Canadian Nuclear Society, with data from IESO)

Wind farms in Ontario
Buildings and structures in Dufferin County